William McDowell may refer to:

 William Fraser McDowell (1858–1937), American bishop
 William John McDowell (1863–1929), Northern Irish politician
 William Osborn McDowell (1845–1927), American financier and businessman
 W. W. McDowell (1867–1934), American politician and diplomat
 William McDowell (cricketer) (1837-1918), Scottish cricketer
 William McDowell (musician) (born 1976), American musician
 William D. McDowell, politician and sheriff in New Jersey
 William Hugh McDowell (1846–1864), VMI cadet killed at the Battle of New Market
 William G. McDowell (1882–1938), American bishop of Alabama

See also
 Bill McDowell (disambiguation)